Elgin is a civil parish in the interior of Albert County, New Brunswick, Canada, the only one of the county's parishes that does not border either the Bay of Fundy or the Petitcodiac River. It comprises two local service districts, both of which are members of the Southeast Regional Service Commission.

The Census subdivision of the same name includes all of the parish.

Origin of name
The parish was probably named in honour of Lord Elgin, who was appointed Governor-General of the Province of Canada in 1847.

History
Elgin Parish was erected in 1847 from the northern part of Harvey Parish.

Located 4.3 km ENE of Goshen: Elgin Parish, Albert County: PO from 1852: in 1866 Elgin was a farming settlement with about 36 families: in 1871 Elgin had a population of 250: in 1898 Elgin was a station on the Elgin, Petitcodiac and Havelock Railway with 1 post office, 6 stores, 3 hotels, 1 sawmill, 1 grist mill, 1 tannery, 1 carriage shop, 1 cheese factory and 2 churches.

Boundaries
Elgin Parish is bounded:
on the north and northwest by the Westmorland County line, beginning at the Kings County line and running northeasterly then northerly to a point about 3.2 kilometres east of Sanatorium Road and about 4 kilometres south of Middlesex Road, on the prolongation of the northern line of a grant to Albert E. Rogers on the Petitcodiac River, about 120 metres south of the mouth of Stoney Creek, then running northeasterly along the Rogers grant prolongation to a point about 2.6 kilometres east of Little River;
on the east by the western line of Hillsborough Parish, a line running south 20º east to the prolongation of the south line of a grant to William Carlisle on the Petitcodiac River, then running easterly along the Carlisle prolongation about 500 metres to a point where Elgin, Hillsborough, Harvey, and Hopewell Parishes meet, about 1.35 kilometres north of Lumsden Road;
on the south by a line running south 72º west to the Kings County line;
on the west by Kings County.

Local service districts

Elgin
Elgin (informally Elgin Centre) was established on 23 November 1966 to assess for fire protection and street lighting following the abolition of county councils under the new Municipalities Act, comprising an irregular area around the community of Elgin;  First aid & ambulance services were added on 14 March 1973.

Today Elgin assesses for street lighting and community & recreation services in addition to the basic LSD services of fire protection, police services, land use planning, emergency measures, and dog control. The taxing authority is 628.00 Elgin Centre.

Elgin Parish
The local service district of the parish of Elgin (informally Elgin Parish), comprising all of the parish outside Elgin, was also established on 23 November 1966 but only assessed for fire protection. Ambulance service was added on 14 March 1973.

Today the parish of Elgin assesses for community & recreation services and basic LSD services. The taxing authority is 614.00 Elgin Parish.

Communities
Communities at least partly within the parish;

Church Hill
Churchs Corner
Elgin
Ferndale
Forest Hill
Goshen
Gowland Mountain
Harrison Settlement
Hillside
Little River
Mapleton
Meadow
Midland
Parkindale
Pleasant Vale
Prosser Brook
River View
Ross Corner
Upper Goshen

Bodies of water
Bodies of water at least partly in the parish:

Kennebecasis River
Little River (formerly Coverdale River)
East Branch Little River
Pollett River
Northwest Branch Crooked Creek
West Branch Turtle Creek
Blackwood Lake
Easter Lake
Wolfe Lake

Other notable places
Parks, historic sites, and other noteworthy places in the parish.
 Cat Road Protected Natural Area
 Fundy National Park
 Mount Tom Protected Natural Area
 Upham Brook Protected Natural Area

Demographics

Population

Language
Mother tongue language (2016)

Access routes
Highways and numbered routes that run through the parish, including external routes that start or finish at the parish limits:

Highways

Principal Routes
None

Secondary Routes:

External Routes:
None

See also
List of parishes in New Brunswick

Notes

References

Parishes of Albert County, New Brunswick
1847 establishments in New Brunswick